PC 8300 was a Sinclair ZX81 clone from China with rubber keys, joystick port, and monitor port. Identical to Lambda 8300 and Power 3000.

Sinclair ZX81 clones